Willem (or William) van der Hagen (died 1745) was a Dutch painter who settled in Ireland in the early 1720s, where he subsequently painted many works of art. He was also active in Europe and England prior to this. He is regarded by many as the founder of the Irish school of landscape painting.

Personal life
Willem van der Hagen was born in the Netherlands, probably in The Hague.  His exact date and place of birth are uncertain.

Career
Van der Hagen first worked in Europe, where he painted views of a number of locations – including one of Gibraltar.  He then settled in England, where he painted views of towns. However, he moved to Ireland in the early 1720s, although his first recorded painting was of Drogheda in 1718. He remained in Ireland the longest. He was one of Ireland's earliest landscape painters and is widely regarded as the founder of the Irish school of landscape painting.

He painted View of Drogheda in 1718, this is probably his earliest work in Ireland. The painting is part of Drogheda municipal collection on show in the towns Highlanes Gallery. He is recorded in Dublin in 1722 painting sets for the Theatre Royal, Dublin. He painted a State Ball in Dublin Castle in 1731 and  a View of Waterford about 1736. The second of these was commissioned by Waterford Corporation, who paid £20 for it in 1736 –  today, it is kept in Waterford City Hall. It is one of the earliest detailed views of an Irish city.

These views were followed in the 1730s by many capriccio landscapes.

One of Van der Hagen's paintings, titled "Corke Harbour 1738", was auctioned in Cork on Wednesday, 11 February 2004. It obtained a price of €360,000. The painting is the oldest known surviving view of Cork Harbour.

References & footnotes

Willem van der Hagen at the RKD database

Bibliography
Foster, R.F., ed. The Oxford Illustrated History of Ireland. UK: Oxford University Press, 1989 - 2000. .

External links

Year of birth unknown
1745 deaths
Hagen, Willem van der
Dutch painters
Dutch male painters
Landscape artists
Artists from The Hague